The Bermuda Under-19 cricket team represents Bermuda in Under-19 international cricket competitions. It has qualified for the ICC Under-19 Cricket World Cup on one occasion, in 2008.

Bermuda took part in the 2009 ICC Americas Under-19 Championship, finishing 3rd and so just missing out on the chance to progress to the World Cup Qualifier. They won three matches losing only to Canada and the United States.

Under-19 World Cup record

References

Under-19 cricket teams
Bermuda in international cricket